Styren is a Norwegian surname. Notable people with the surname include:

Christian Styren (born 1965), Norwegian diver
Ulf Styren (1890–1974), Norwegian businessman

Norwegian-language surnames